Curve (also known as the Curve card) is a payment card that aggregates multiple payment cards through its accompanying mobile app, allowing a user to make payments and withdrawals from a single card. It lets you "switch the bank card you paid with after each transaction is complete." Curve named this feature "Back in time".

History
Curve, which owns and operates the card and for which the card is named, was founded in 2015 by Shachar Bialick. The company secured seed funding of $2 million in December 2015.  An open beta for iOS users in the "business community" was launched in February 2016. In May 2016, Curve notified customers that it would no longer be able to support American Express after 31 May 2016, offering refunds. In December 2016, Curve announced that the app was made available for Android users.

At Wired Money in 2017, Curve was judged the winning startup by a panel of three judges. In July 2017, it was still in beta testing.

It launched in Ireland in January 2018. At that time, it remained based in London. When it launched in the UK, it had a waiting list of 50,000. Curve went live in the UK in January 2018. In December 2018, it had a US expansion planned. Support for American Express was reintroduced in late January 2019 on a top-up basis. When Amex blocked several thousand customers from using Curve's services that week, on February 1, 2019, it was reported that Curve was considering suing Amex, alleging anti-competitive action. In 2019, Curve launched a metal card. The card was made of 18 grammes of stainless steel, and came in three colours: Blue Steel, Rose Gold, and Curve Red Limited Edition. Only 5,000 Limited-Edition Curve Red cards were printed in a single run.

Curve card and app
Using the mobile app, users link their debit and credit cards to the Curve card. A default card from which to make payments or withdrawals can then be set, while users can also switch between cards on the app prior to making payments or withdrawals. Transactions on the card are processed through the MasterCard network and can be made using EMV (chip), magnetic stripe or contactless payment.

The Curve app works for iOS and Android.

In July 2017, Curve rolled out a feature on the app allowing users to retroactively change their selected payment card for a transaction as old as 14 days. In 2018, it added a "zero fees" feature for spending internationally.

In October 2018, the company said it was aiming to become "the Amazon of banking."
 
For a time from January 2019 Curve supported American Express, but this was later discontinued.

In September 2021, Curve launched a new Buy Now Pay Later feature branded Curve Flex.

Controversy
In November 2019, Business Insider reported Curve had failed to disclose to crowdfund investors that just 14% of its customers were using Curve once a month or more; Curve had raised more than $7 million through crowdfunding in September 2019. According to the article, only 72,000 of Curve's stated 500,000 customers were using its product even once a month. The company did not respond when approached by Business Insider for comment. The issue was reported in Wikipedia's Curve (payment card) article, Controversy section (this section) on 28 November 2019, but the section was blanked on 2 and 3 December 2019, and fully reinstated with additions on 9 February 2020. The Telegraph reported that day that Curve was accused of removing details of the Business Insider story from the Wikipedia article.

References

Payment cards
Products introduced in 2015